Table tennis was contested at the 1958 Asian Games in Waseda University Gymnasium, Tokyo, Japan from May 25 to 31 May 1958.

Table tennis had team, doubles and singles events for men and women, as well as a mixed doubles competition.

Schedule

Medalists

Medal table

Participating nations
A total of 46 athletes from 7 nations competed in table tennis at the 1958 Asian Games:

References

 ITTF Database

External links
OCA official website

 
1958 Asian Games events
1958
Asian Games
1958 Asian Games